Olivia Różański  (born ) is a French-born Polish volleyball player. She is part of the Poland women's national volleyball team and the daughter of international Jarosława Różańska.

Career

Club

Youth
She started her career at hometown club Albi-USSP.

After moving to Poland from France aged 17, she played for JKS SMS Jastrzębie, whilst simultaneously attending and representing SMS PZPS Szczyrk sports academy.

Professional
She began her professional career at BKS Bielsko-Biała before spending two seasons (2020-2021 and 2021-2022) at Legionovia Legionowo.

For the 2022-2023 she signed for Serie A1 team Chieri 76.

International
She made her debut for Poland's B team in 2015, who represented the country in 2015 Women's European Volleyball League.

She participated in the 2018 FIVB Volleyball Women's Nations League.

Honours 
Volley Masters Montreux:
 Gold medal: 2019

References

External links 

 CEV profile
 FIVB profile

1997 births
Living people
Polish women's volleyball players
Place of birth missing (living people)